The Battle of Gallipoli was fought by the Entente powers against the Ottoman Empire on the Gallipoli peninsula between 1915 and 1916.

Battle of Gallipoli may also refer to:
 Battle of Gallipoli (1312), a battle between the Byzantine Empire and Turkish raiders
 Fall of Gallipoli, the 1354 capture of Gallipoli by the Ottomans
 Reconquest of Gallipoli, the 1366 recapture of Gallipoli for Byzantium by Amadeus VI of Savoy
 Battle of Gallipoli (1416), a naval battle between the Republic of Venice and the Ottoman Empire

See also
Battle of the Dardanelles (disambiguation)